Alistair Edward McCann (born 4 December 1999) is a professional footballer who plays for Preston North End, as a midfielder. Born in Scotland, he represents Northern Ireland at international level.

Early and personal life
Born in Edinburgh, McCann and his brothers Lewis (who is also a footballer) and Ross (who is Scotland rugby 7s player) were born and raised in Scotland to a Northern Irish father and an English mother.

Club career
McCann moved from Hutchison Vale Boys Club to St Johnstone in 2012. He made his senior debut on 29 January 2018.

McCann joined Stranraer on loan in February 2019.

He moved to Preston North End on 31 August 2021.

International career
McCann has played youth football for Northern Ireland, including at under-21 level.

On 15 November 2020, McCann made his senior international debut, against Austria.

Career statistics

Honours
St Johnstone
Scottish Cup: 2020–21
Scottish League Cup: 2020–21

References

1999 births
Living people
Footballers from Edinburgh
Association footballers from Northern Ireland
Northern Ireland youth international footballers
Northern Ireland under-21 international footballers
Northern Ireland international footballers
Scottish footballers
People from Northern Ireland of English descent
Scottish people of Northern Ireland descent
Scottish people of English descent
Lothian Thistle Hutchison Vale F.C. players
St Johnstone F.C. players
Scottish Professional Football League players
Association football midfielders
Stranraer F.C. players
Preston North End F.C. players
English Football League players